Walker Wood (April 23, 1874 - February 3, 1957) was an American journalist and politician from Mississippi. He was the 30th Secretary of State of Mississippi, serving from 1926 to 1948.

Early life 
Walker Wood was born on April 23, 1874, in Vicksburg, Mississippi. He was the son of William Menefee Wood and Josephine (Kendrick) Wood. He was educated in the public schools in the Vicksburg area.

Newspapers 
At the age of eighteen, he began a career in journalism. He was in charge of the Oxford Eagle from 1892 until he purchased the Senatobia Democrat and started being the editor of that newspaper in 1899. He edited the Winona Times until 1940.

Political career 
A Democrat, Wood was elected to the Mississippi House of Representatives representing Tate County in 1907 for the 1908-1912 term. On April 7, 1926, he was appointed to the position of Secretary of State of Mississippi by Governor Whitfield after the death of Joseph Withers Power. In 1945, he was the president of the National Association of Secretaries of State. He stopped being the Secretary of State of Mississippi in 1948. He was the president of the Mississippi State Microfilm Department from 1950 until his retirement in December 1956.

Death 
Wood died after a long illness on February 3, 1957, in a hospital in Jackson, Mississippi. He was survived by his wife and two daughters.

Personal life 
Wood married Susie Garrott Meacham on February 19, 1902. They had at least three children, Olivia Elizabeth Wood, George Meacham Wood, and another daughter. Wood was a Methodist.

References 

1874 births
1957 deaths
Secretaries of State of Mississippi
Editors of Mississippi newspapers
Democratic Party members of the Mississippi House of Representatives
People from Tate County, Mississippi
People from Vicksburg, Mississippi